Cuff Cape is a dark rock headland emerging from the icy coast of Victoria Land, immediately south of Mackay Glacier. It was mapped by the British Antarctic Expedition, 1910–13, and so named because the dark rock resembles a hand extending from a snowy cuff.

References
 

Headlands of Victoria Land
Scott Coast